A sequence, in mathematics, is an ordered list of elements.

Sequence may also refer to:

Arts and media

Film
 Sequence (filmmaking), a series of shots or scenes, edited together in succession
 Sequence (journal), a film journal
 Séquences, a Quebec film magazine
 Sequence (2013 film), a 2013 short fantasy horror film
 Sequence, a 16 minute film directed by David Winning

Games
 Sequence (game), a board-and-card game distributed by Jax Ltd., Inc.

Music
 Sequence (music), a passage which is successively repeated at different pitches
 Sequence (musical form), a medieval Latin poem or its musical setting which became part of the Mass
 The Sequence, a 1980s all-female hip-hop/funk trio

Science, technology, and mathematics

Biology and medicine
 Sequence (biology), the primary structure of a biopolymer
 Sequencing, determining the primary structure of an unbranched biopolymer
 DNA sequencing, determining the order of the nucleotide bases in a DNA molecule
 Protein sequencing
 Primary sequence, the sequence of a biological macromolecule
 Sequence analysis
 Sequence (medicine), a series of ordered consequences due to a single cause

Other uses in science, technology, and mathematics
 Sequence (geology), a succession of geological events
 Archaeological sequence
 Sequence diagram, used to visualise the design of a computing system
 Sequential manual transmission, a type of manual automotive transmission
 Sequence of events, a time-related notion in physics and metaphysics
 Sequences (book), mathematics book by Heini Halberstam and Klaus Roth
 List (abstract data type)

Other uses
 Sequence of tenses, in grammar

See also 
 Sequencer (disambiguation)
 Sequin (disambiguation)